Zawgyi River is a river of eastern Burma (Myanmar). It flows through the foothills of the Shan Mountain range in Shan State.

Notes

Rivers of Myanmar
Geography of Shan State